South Ruthenian or Southern Ruthenian may refer to:

 something or someone related to southern regions of Ruthenia (those regions are now belonging to the modern Ukraine)
 southern varieties of the Ruthenian language (those varieties evolved into the modern Ukrainian language)

See also
 Ruthenia (disambiguation)
 Ruthenian (disambiguation)